Puente, a word meaning bridge in Spanish language, may refer to:

People
 Puente (surname)

Places
La Puente, California, USA
Puente Alto, city and commune of Chile
Puente de Ixtla, city in Mexico
Puente Genil, village in the Spanish province of Córdoba
Puente La Reina, town and municipality located in the autonomous community of Navarra, in northern Spain
Puente Nacional, Veracruz, municipality in Mexico
Puente Piedra District, district in Peru
Puente, Camuy, Puerto Rico, a barrio
Puentes de García Rodríguez, municipality in Ferrolterra, in northwestern Spain
West Puente Valley, California, USA

Bridges and transport
Puente Aranda (TransMilenio), mass-transit system of Bogotá, Colombia
Puente Centenario, major bridge crossing the Panama Canal
Puente Colgante, transporter bridge in Spain
Puente Colgante, a suspension bridge in Manila, Philippines
Puente de Boyacà, bridge in Colombia
Puente La Amistad de Taiwán, Taiwan-Costa Rica's Friendship Bridge, in Costa Rica
Puente de la Mujer, bridge in Buenos Aires, Argentina 
Puente del Alamillo, bridge in Seville, Andalusia, Spain
Puente de las Américas, bridge in Panama
Puente de la Unidad, bridge in Mexico
Puente de Piedra, bridge in Lima, Peru
Puente de Vizcaya, bridge in Spain
Puente Internacional Tancredo Neves, bridge in Brazil
Puente Largo (TransMilenio), mass transit system in Colombia
Puente Nuevo, bridge in southern Spain
Puente Viejo, bridge in southern Spain

Other uses
Puente del Inca, natural arch that forms a bridge, located in Argentina
Puente Hills, chain of hills in an unincorporated area in eastern Los Angeles County, California, USA
Puente Hills Mall, located in Industry, California, USA
Puente (holiday), the day between a holiday and the weekend
"Puente" (song), by Ricardo Arjona

See also
El Puente (disambiguation)